Dzhambazki (masculine) or Dzhambazka (feminine) is a Bulgarian surname. Notable people with the surname include:

Angel Dzhambazki (born 1979), Bulgarian politician
Atanas Dzhambazki (born 1969), Bulgarian football manager and former player

Bulgarian-language surnames